Croisilles is a commune in the Calvados department in the Normandy region in northwestern France.

The mother of explorer Dumont D'Urville was born in Croisilles. He named an inlet of New Zealand's coast Croisilles Harbour after the village.

Population

See also
Communes of the Calvados department

References

Communes of Calvados (department)
Calvados communes articles needing translation from French Wikipedia